Thomas Furlong may refer to:

Thomas Furlong (artist) (1886–1952), Scotch Irish American artist and teacher
Thomas Furlong (poet) (1794–1827), Irish poet